Sarcosaurus (meaning "flesh lizard") is a genus of basal neotheropod dinosaur, roughly  long. It lived in what is now England during the Hettangian-Sinemurian stages of the Early Jurassic, about 199-194 million years ago. Sarcosaurus is one of the earliest known Jurassic theropods, and one of only a handful of theropod genera from this time period. Along with Dracoraptor hanigani it is one of the two described neotheropods from the lowermost Jurassic of the United Kingdom.

Description

The holotype is NHMUK PV R4840 a partial skeleton that includes a posterior dorsal vertebra, partial left and right ilia, that are fused to the proximal portion of the pubis, lacking the femoral head. The specimen shows some evidence of skeletal maturity, meaning it is not an early juvenile, but its exact ontogenetic stage cannot be ascertained. Referred specimens include the non mature NHMUK PV R3542 (holotype of Sarcosaurus andrewsi) that includes a complete right tibia; WARMS G667–690, a partial skeleton of a single individual that includes posterior dorsal vertebra, middle caudal vertebra, dorsal rib fragments, left ilium, right and left pubes, femora and tibiae, proximal end of left fibula, probable distal half of fibula, distal portions of metatarsals IV, II or III proximal half of left pedal phalanx II-1, and three indeterminate bone fragments. Sarcosaurus shares certain morphological conditions with other neotheropods, including Liliensternus liliensterni (collateral fossae of the metatarsal II with similar development and shape on both sides, larger ratio on the centrum) and Dilophosaurus wetherilli (lateral collateral fossa is bigger than the medial one in the metatarsal, middle caudal series proportionately lower and narrower than the middle−posterior dorsal vertebra). Sarcosaurus was a bipedal predator, probably able to run fast and catch small prey. The holotype belonged to a 3.5 m long animal whose weight was no greater than 50–60 kg. NHMUK PV R3542 belonged to a larger animal, estimated to have had a maximum length of 5 m and a weight of 140 kg.

History of discovery

The fossils of Sarcosaurus were found in the Lower Lias of England. The type species, Sarcosaurus woodi, was first described by Charles William Andrews in 1921 shortly after a partial skeleton had been found by S.L. Wood near Barrow-on-Soar, in the Scunthorpe Mudstone. The generic name is derived from Greek sarx, "flesh". The specific name honours Wood. The holotype, BMNH 4840/1, consists of a pelvis, a vertebra and the upper part of a femur. A second species, Sarcosaurus andrewsi, was named by Friedrich von Huene in 1932, based on a  tibia, BMNH R3542, described by Arthur Smith Woodward in 1908 and found near Wilmcote. Confusingly von Huene in the same publication named the very same fossil Magnosaurus woodwardi. Later he made a choice for S. andrewsi to be the valid name. Huene also discussed WARMS G667–690, a partial skeleton also from Wilmcote, both specimens are from the Blue Lias. In 1974 S. andrewsi was reclassified as Megalosaurus andrewsi by Michael Waldman, on the probably erroneous assumption it was a megalosaurid. A later study concluded the two species to be indistinguishable except for size, but other authors consider any identity to be unprovable as there are no comparable remains and conclude both species to lack autapomorphies and therefore to be nomina dubia.
Von Huene in 1932 referred a partial skeleton from the collection of the Warwick Museum to S. woodi but the identity was unproven; in 1995 it was given the informal name "Liassaurus" but this has remained a nomen nudum. The specimen is likely one individual, located in the same stratiagraphic position as the holotypic specimen. Unfortunately, there are few available overlapping elements from the specimen and the holotype. Both specimens preserve a relatively complete femur: however, the features of both (an anteromedially directed head, a relatively long fourth trochanter and a trochanteric shelf) are plesiomorphic and thus do not indicate conspecifity or clade membership. It is noted, however, that there are no features which are present in one specimen but not the other. In 2020 WARMS G667–690 was given a comprehensive redescription, which proposed that all three specimens belonged to the same species, Sarcosaurus woodi.

Phylogeny

Andrews originally assigned Sarcosaurus to the Megalosauridae. The first to suggest a more basal position was Samuel Paul Welles who placed it in the Coelophysidae. Later analyses resulted in either a position in the Ceratosauria, or in the Coelophysoidea. Ezcurra (2012) found Sarcosaurus to be the most basal ceratosaur in a large unpublished analysis. In 2018, Andrea Cau in the large analysis of Saltriovenator found Sarcosaurus to be a dilophosaurid with good amount of support in the data. In 2020, Ezcurra et al. recovered Sarcosaurus as a close relative of Averostra due to the presence of shared characters including an anteroventrally oriented ventral margin of the preacetabular process in lateral view on the ilium and a femur with a poorly posteriorly developed fourth trochanter. Their cladogram is shown below:

Palaeoenvironment
Holotype specimen was collected from strata (bucklandi zone, Sinemurian) that were deposited in epicontinental, shallow, marine settings affected by sea-level fluctuations and a warm, predominantly humid climate. In south-western Warwickshire, is represented by the upper part of the Rugby Limestone Member (Hettangian-Sinemurian) of the Blue Lias Formation. with typical lithofacies of alternating mudrocks and generally fine-grained and frequently highly fossiliferous limestones. the Rugby Limestone Member was
deposited at a palaeolatitude of approximately 35° N in a storm-influenced offshore setting. Wilmcote was related to the eastern margin of the Worcester Graben during the Early Jurassic and adjacent to the East Midlands Shelf. The western margin of the emergent London Platform at 60−80 km to the south-east was probably the principal source of terrestrial biodebris.

See also

 Timeline of coelophysoid research

References

External links 
 Sarcosaurus in the Dino Directory

Prehistoric neotheropods
Hettangian life
Sinemurian life
Early Jurassic dinosaurs of Europe
Jurassic England
Fossils of England
Fossil taxa described in 1921
Taxa named by Charles William Andrews